Thomas Huber (born 18 November 1966 in Palling, Bavaria) is a German climber and mountaineer. He lives in Berchtesgaden with his family. His brother and regular climbing partner is Alexander Huber, and the two are called "Huberbuam" (Huberboys) in the Bavarian dialect; they were the subject of the 2007 film To the Limit.  In 2001, Huber won the 10th Piolet d'Or award with Iwan Wolf for their ascent of the direct north pillar of Shivling.

Early life and education
Thomas Huber was born November 18, 1966, in Palling, Bavaria as the first child of Thomas and Maria Huber.

His father was a climber known for early speed ascents of now classic climbs. He took him and his brother Alexander Huber, into the mountains. He has been climbing since he was 10 years old. In early April 1980, at 13 years of age, his father took them to climb their first 4000m peak, the Allalinhorn. In 1982, he climbed the Rebitsch Crack 5.10/A0 on the Fleischbankpfeiler in the Wilder Kaiser with the youth climbing team.

In 1983, he and his brother spent their first climbing vacation without their father. They started at the little village of Ellmau, and spent a week at the Gaudeamushütte in the Wilder Kaiser to pursue routes on the east face of Karlspitze or the Bauernpredigtstuhl. Towards the end of the holidays, they went for their first ascent, starting out at the Reiter Alpe for the Wagendrischelhorn south face. Their route was named Rauhnachtstanz, 5.10.

Career
Since 1992 Huber has been a state-certified mountain and skiing guide. He is most famous for climbing big walls in the Himalaya.

The 2007 documentary To the Limit shows him and his brother speed climbing.

In July 2016, Huber had a sixteen-meter free fall while being filmed at a wall on the Brendlberg in the vicinity of Berchtesgaden and suffered a skull fracture; In August 2016 he was able to go on the next expedition.

Personal life
Huber lives in Berchtesgaden with his wife and three children. 
In 2011, he was diagnosed with a kidney tumor, which was removed and turned out to be benign. For 2 months afterwards he felt weakened.

Notable achievements

1994 First redpoint ascent of "The end of Silence" (5.13d/X+/8b+), one of the hardest multi-pitch climbing routes in the world at that time
1996 Free ascent of the route "Salathé Wall" on El Capitan in Yosemite Valley;  Winter solo ascent of the Eiger north face
1997 First ascent of the route "Tsering Mosong" (VII+,A3+) on Latok II, 7108m, Pakistan.
1998 First ascent of "El Niño" on El Capitan, and "Free Rider", the first male free ascent of an El Capitan route in one day with Alexander Huber
1999 Second ascent of the south west wall of Latok IV (6445m), Pakistan.
2000 First ascent of the direct north pillar of the Shivling (6543m) with Iwan Wolf and winner of the Piolet d'Or
2001 First ascent of Baintha Brakk III (6800m), second ascent of Baintha Brakk I (7285m), Pakistan.
2003 First free ascent of "Zodiac" (5.13d/X+/8b+) on El Capitan with Alexander Huber
2004 Speed record on El Capitan, "Zodiac", in 1:52h
2007 Speed record on El Capitan, "The Nose", in 2:45,45h
2008 First ascent of the west wall of Holtanna in Queen Maud Land, Antarctica, together with brother Alexander and Stephan Siegrist
2008 Ascent of Ulvetanna in Queen Maud Land, Antarctica, together with brother Alexander and Stephan Siegrist
2009 First free ascent with Alexander of Eternal Flame, (5.13a), on Trango ("Nameless") Tower (6,239 m), Pakistan.

Publications
Alexander Huber and Thomas Huber: The Wall. BLV, 2000, 
Thomas Huber: Ogre - Gipfel der Träume, BLV, 2002,

References

External links
http://www.huberbuam.de
 
 

1966 births
Living people
People from Traunstein (district)
Sportspeople from Upper Bavaria
German mountain climbers
German rock climbers
Piolet d'Or winners